St. Anthony of Padua Parish may refer to:
 St. Anthony of Padua Parish (Fairfield, Connecticut)
 St. Anthony of Padua Parish Church (Camaligan)